The Guerreros de Oaxaca (English: Oaxaca Warriors) are a professional baseball team in the Mexican League based in Oaxaca City, Oaxaca, Mexico. Their home field is Estadio Eduardo Vasconcelos.

History 
In October 1995, a group of businessmen, led by Alfredo Harp Helú, learned that the Charros de Jalisco were unable to continue participating in the league. These businessmen saw the opportunity to move the team from Guadalajara to the city of Oaxaca, and the project was officially presented at a meeting of directors of the Mexican League. The franchise move was officially accepted in December of that year and the new Guerreros, as they were named, played their first game on 14 March 1996, under the direction of manager Alfredo 'Lefty' Ortiz. The team recruited Mexican batter Nelson Barrera for its inaugural season. The Guerreros were the first ever professional sports team based in Oaxaca City.

The Guerreros won their first and only league championship in 1998 by sweeping Acereros de Monclova in the final series.

Former Major League Baseball player Oscar Azócar played for the Warriors in 2000.

Roster

Retired numbers

References

External links 
  

 
Baseball teams established in 1996
Baseball teams in Mexico
Mexican League teams
1996 establishments in Mexico
Sports teams in Oaxaca